Andrej Lukić (born 2 April 1994) is a Croatian footballer who plays as a defender for Hungarian club Mezőkövesd.

Club career
Lukić made his Croatian First Football League debut for Osijek on 20 October 2012 in a game against Zadar.

On 21 August 2018, he joined Apollon Smyrni on a season-long loan from Braga.

On 1 August 2019, he joined Moldovan club Sheriff Tiraspol on loan.

On 19 January 2022, Lukić moved to Mezőkövesd in Hungary.

References

External links
 

1994 births
Living people
People from Nova Gradiška
Association football defenders
Croatian footballers
NK Osijek players
HNK Cibalia players
S.C. Braga players
S.C. Braga B players
Apollon Smyrnis F.C. players
FC Emmen players
FC Sheriff Tiraspol players
NK Hrvatski Dragovoljac players
Mezőkövesdi SE footballers
Croatian Football League players
First Football League (Croatia) players
Primeira Liga players
Liga Portugal 2 players
Super League Greece players
Eredivisie players
Moldovan Super Liga players
Nemzeti Bajnokság I players
Croatian expatriate footballers
Expatriate footballers in Portugal
Expatriate footballers in Greece
Expatriate footballers in the Netherlands
Expatriate footballers in Moldova
Expatriate footballers in Hungary
Croatian expatriate sportspeople in Portugal
Croatian expatriate sportspeople in Greece
Croatian expatriate sportspeople in the Netherlands
Croatian expatriate sportspeople in Moldova
Croatian expatriate sportspeople in Hungary